Molybdenum(III) iodide is the inorganic compound with the formula MoI3.

Preparation

2 Mo(CO)6 + 3 I2 → 2 MoI3 + 12 CO

It can also be made from molybdenum(V) chloride and a solution of hydrogen iodide in carbon disulfide.

MoCl5 + 5 HI → MoI3 + 5 HCl + I2

2 Mo + 3 I2 → 2 MoI3

As molybdenum(III) iodide is the highest stable iodide of molybdenum, this is the preferred route.

Properties 
Molybdenum(III) iodide is a black antiferromagnetic solid that is air-stable at room temperature. In vacuum, it decomposes above 100 °C to molybdenum(II) iodide and iodine. It is insoluble in polar and non-polar solvents. Its crystal structure is isotypic with zirconium(III) iodide.

References

 Momlybdenum triiodide at Web Elements

Iodides
Molybdenum halides
Molybdenum(III) compounds